Greezy Wheels is an Austin, Texas-based rock/alternative/Americana band that formed in the 1970s. They played more frequently at the Armadillo World Headquarters than any other band in the history of the venue.  They are regarded as the Armadillo house band and are elected members of the Austin Music Hall Of Fame.

Greezy Wheels' music is a raucous blend of rock, funk, R&B, alt-country, and Ozarks.  In their early days, they were the only band with a female fiddler, Sweet Mary Hattersley. Sweet Mary consistently brought the crowd to a screaming frenzy with her version of the "Orange Blossom Special."  The music of Greezy Wheels reflected the cultural dichotomy of Austin in the 1970s — a unique place where hippies had roots deep in the heart of Texas.  Greezy Wheels opened Willie Nelson's first ever Armadillo World Headquarters show, putting him in front of the hippies who then adopted him and have been his fans ever since.  They have shared the stage with (literally) too many greats to name.

The band played up to 1978, when they took a 23-year hiatus. Greezy Wheels reformed in 2001 and are now recording for their own label, MaHatMa Records, after releasing two CDs on the Tana Records label. Their music has become more sophisticated, but has kept its off-the-page personality and musical comparisons are difficult to make. Principal writer and leader, Cleve Hattersley, continues to write quirky music that gets good airplay around the country. Sweet Mary still blows people up with her fiddle.

Current members of the band:  Cleve Hattersley on vocals, guitar, slide guitar, Lissa Hattersley on vocals, Sweet Mary Hattersley on fiddle and vocals, Penny Jo Pullus on vocals, Brad Houser (original member of Edie Brickell & New Bohemians) on bass and baritone sax, John Bush (also an original New Bohemian) on drums, and Matt Hubbard (7 Walkers) on keyboards, harmonica, accordion and trombone.

CD's:  'Millennium Greezy' (2001), 'HipPop' (2004), 'String Theory' (2007), 'Gone Greezy' (2011), Kitty Cat Jesus (2013), Unusual Thing (2014)

The old stuff:  'Juz Loves Dem Ol' Greezy Wheels' (1975), 'Radio Radials' (1976) - both on London Records.

References 

 greezywheels.com

External links 
 
 https://www.facebook.com/pages/Greezy-Wheels/135780649818982
 Cleve and Sweet Mary Hattersley of Greezy Wheels on Rag Radio. Interviewed by Thorne Dreyer, April 29, 2011, with live performance. (56:42)

Rock music groups from Texas
Musical groups from Austin, Texas